Jorge Antunes is an Angolan actor and TV host. He is best known for hosting Estrelas ao Palco on TPA and Quem quer ser milionário? (Who Wants to Be a Millionaire?).

References

Angolan male actors
Living people
Year of birth missing (living people)
Place of birth missing (living people)